The Bobby Broom Organi-Sation is a Chicago based jazz organ trio composed of jazz guitarist Bobby Broom, Hammond B3 organist Ben Paterson and drummers Makaya McCraven or Kobie Watkins. Broom is a 2015 DownBeat Readers Poll and multi-year Critics Poll honoree for his work as one of the top jazz guitarists in the world, McCraven and Watkins also perform with Broom's main group, The Bobby Broom Trio.

Broom formed the group in 2014 after a call by Steely Dan's Walter Becker and Donald Fagen for the Deep Blue Organ Trio which had disbanded following the rock group's 2013 tour.

The Bobby Broom Organi-Sation opened for Steely Dan on their Jamalot Ever After 2014 national tour that spanned 52 dates, and 43 cities, across the United States and Canada.

The group is the evolution of Broom's passion for the concept of the guitar-organ-drum trio established by, among others, the ground-breaking Jazz legend Wes Montgomery with his landmark 1959 album A Dynamic New Sound:Guitar, Organ and Drums

The group includes: Bobby Broom, Ben Paterson a Philadelphia-born jazz organist based in New York City, and drummer Makaya McCraven or Kobie Watkins.

References

American jazz ensembles from Illinois
Musical groups established in 2014
American musical trios
2014 establishments in Illinois